Clivina balfourbrownei is a species of ground beetle in the subfamily Scaritinae. It was described by Kult in 1951.

References

balfourbrownei
Beetles described in 1951